Su Chin-shou was a Chinese Muslim general of the 36th Division (National Revolutionary Army), who served under Generals Ma Zhongying and Ma Hushan. He was the Chief of Staff of General Ma Zhancang and was appointed as one of the two tao-yins of Kashgar in May, 1933. He vacated the old city Yamen to join Ma Zhancang in the New City since his fellow Chinese Muslims were massacred at the Kizil massacre.

References

External links 
Flags of Independence

Hui people
Republic of China warlords from Gansu
Chinese Muslim generals
National Revolutionary Army generals from Gansu
Possibly living people
Xinjiang Wars